Tam Hiệp may refer to several places in Vietnam, including: 

Tam Hiệp, Biên Hòa, a ward of Biên Hòa
Tam Hiệp, Thanh Trì, a commune of Thanh Trì District in Hanoi
Tam Hiệp, Phúc Thọ, a commune of Phúc Thọ District in Hanoi
Tam Hiệp, Bắc Giang, a commune of Yên Thế District
Tam Hiệp, Bến Tre, a commune of Bình Đại District
Tam Hiệp, Quảng Nam, a commune of Núi Thành District
Tam Hiệp, Tiền Giang, a commune of Châu Thành District, Tiền Giang